The pisiform joint is a joint between the pisiform and triquetrum.

It includes the pisohamate ligament and pisometacarpal ligament.

References 

Hand
Joints
Upper limb anatomy